The May 1974 Canadian federal budget was presented by Minister of Finance John Turner in the House of Commons of Canada on 6 May 1974. It was meant to serve as the federal budget for fiscal year 1974–1975, but it was never implemented as the government was defeated in a vote of confidence before it was adopted. The NDP, which had been propping up Pierre Trudeau’s minority government for the past two years, withdrew their support because they were displeased with the content of this budget. This paved the way for the 1974 Canadian federal election, in which Trudeau's Liberal Party won with a majority of the seats.

The budget saw the inception of the Registered Home Ownership Savings Plan.

External links 
 Budget Speech
 Budget highlights

References

1974 05
Federal budget, 1974 05
Canadian federal budget, 1974 05
Federal budget, 05